The Commission for Diversity in the Public Realm is an initiative established on 9 June 2020 by the Mayor of London, Sadiq Khan, to review public tributes in the British capital, including statues and other landmarks.

History
The commission was formed in response to the George Floyd protests in the United Kingdom, in which protesters toppled a statue of Edward Colston in Bristol and defaced a number of statues across the country. The commission will focus on increasing diversity in London's street names, monuments, public sculptures and artworks, murals and place names.

Its fifteen members were announced in February 2021, and include Riz Ahmed, Jack Guinness, Sandy Nairne and Jasvir Singh.

In 2022 the commission announced its "Untold Stories" programme, to distribute £1 million of funding to community projects across the city. By February 2023, 70 projects had been funded across 24 London boroughs,
with plans including a panel and bench commemorating the 1981 New Cross house fire, a memorial to Rolan Adams in Thamesmead, and a statue of Ella Adoo-Kissi-Debrah in Mountsfield Park, Lewisham.

See also
List of public statues of individuals linked to the Atlantic slave trade
Actions against memorials in the United Kingdom during the George Floyd protests
Mayor's Commission on African and Asian Heritage

References

External links
 
 "Mayor unveils commission to review diversity of London's public realm", Mayor of London–London Assembly press release, 9 June 2020.

2020 establishments in the United Kingdom
2020 in London
Anti-racism in the United Kingdom
George Floyd protests
Race-related controversies in the United Kingdom